Amblyacrum dameriacense is an extinct species of sea snail, a marine gastropod mollusc in the family Mangeliidae.

It was renamed as Raphitoma defrancei by J. Tucker & Le Renard in 1993

Description

Distribution
Fossils of this extinct marine species were found in Eocene strata in France.

References
Citations

Bibliography
 Cossmann (M.) & Pissarro (G.), 1913 Iconographie complète des coquilles fossiles de l'Éocène des environs de Paris, t. 2, p. pl. 46-65 
 Le Renard (J.) & Pacaud (J.-M.), 1995 Révision des Mollusques paléogènes du Bassin de Paris. 2 - Liste des références primaires des espèces. Cossmanniana, t. 3, vol. 3, p. 65-132
 Tucker, J.K. & Le Renard, J. (1993) Liste bibliographique des Turridae (Gastropoda, Conacea) du Paléogène de l'Angleterre, de la Belgique et de la France. Cossmanniana, 2(1/2), 1–66.
 Pacaud J.M. (2021). Remarques taxonomiques et nomenclaturales sur les mollusques gastéropodes du Paléogène de France et description d'espèces nouvelles. Partie 3. Conoidea. Xenophora Taxonomy. 31: 41–48.

External links
 Deshayes, G. P. (1864-1865). Description des animaux sans vertèbres découverts dans le bassin de Paris pour servir de supplément à la Description des coquilles fossiles des environs de Paris comprenant une revue générale de toutes les espèces actuellement connues. Tome troisiéme. Mollusques céphalés, deuxième partie. Mollusques céphalopodes. 1-667, pls 63-107. Paris, Baillière
 Deshayes, G. P. (1824-1837). Description des coquilles fossiles des environs de Paris. Paris, published by the author.
 

Mangeliidae
Gastropods described in 1865